Pat McNulty (24 April 1876 – 6 October 1904) was an Australian rules footballer who played with Carlton in the Victorian Football League (VFL).

Notes

External links 		
		
Pat McNulty's profile at Blueseum		
 
	
		
		

Australian rules footballers from Victoria (Australia)		
Carlton Football Club players
1876 births
1904 deaths